The Taynton Limestone is a geological formation in Oxfordshire in the United Kingdom. It dates to the Middle Jurassic, mid-Bathonian stage. It predominantly consists of ooidal grainstone. The term "Stonesfield Slate" refers to slaty limestone horizons within the formation that during the 18th and 19th centuries were extensively quarried for use in roof tiling within the vicinity of Stonesfield, Oxfordshire. Previously these were thought to belong to the Sharp's Hill Formation, but boreholes and shaft sections suggest that at least three horizons within the Taynton Limestone were quarried for the slate. These horizons are well known for producing a diverse set of fossils including those of plants, insects as well as vertebrates, including some of the earliest known mammals, pterosaurs as well as those of first dinosaur ever described, Megalosaurus.

Vertebrate fauna

Reptiles

Mammaliamorphs

Fish

Invertebrate fauna

Flora 
The flora known from the Stonesfield Slate comprises a relatively diverse flora, with 25 morphospecies present. It primarily represents a coastal environment, perhaps seasonally dry  with mangrove like environments. It is a noticeably different assemblage than the Yorkshire floras of equivalent age, possibly because the latter is thought to represent a deltaic, wetland environment

See also 

 List of dinosaur-bearing rock formations

References 

Geologic formations of England
Geology of Oxfordshire
Jurassic England
Middle Jurassic Europe
Bathonian Stage
Jurassic System of Europe
Limestone formations
Fossiliferous stratigraphic units of Europe
Paleontology in the United Kingdom